Gilbert is a town in Lexington County, South Carolina, United States. The population was 569 at the 2010 census. It is part of the Columbia, South Carolina Metropolitan Statistical Area.

History
The David Jefferson Griffith House and Music Hall Evangelical Lutheran Church were listed on the U.S. National Register of Historic Places in 1983.

Geography

Demographics

As of the census of 2000, there were 500 people, 181 households, and 148 families residing in the town. The population density was 220.7 people per square mile (85.0/km2). There were 195 housing units at an average density of 86.1 per square mile (33.2/km2). The racial makeup of the town was 94.60% White, 3.60% African American, 0.20% Native American, 0.20% Asian, 0.20% from other races, and 1.20% from two or more races. Hispanic or Latino of any race were 1.60% of the population.

There were 181 households, out of which 53.0% had children under the age of 18 living with them, 56.4% were married couples living together, 16.6% had a female householder with no husband present, and 18.2% were non-families. 16.0% of all households were made up of individuals, and 6.6% had someone living alone who was 65 years of age or older. The average household size was 2.76 and the average family size was 3.05.

In the town, the population was spread out, with 33.2% under the age of 18, 7.0% from 18 to 24, 32.4% from 25 to 44, 19.6% from 45 to 64, and 7.8% who were 65 years of age or older. The median age was 32 years. For every 100 females, there were 93.8 males. For every 100 females age 18 and over, there were 96.5 males.

The median income for a household in the town was $46,563, and the median income for a family was $52,500. Males had a median income of $35,707 versus $25,000 for females. The per capita income for the town was $19,909. About 8.9% of families and 8.6% of the population were below the poverty line, including 11.3% of those under age 18 and 15.6% of those age 65 or over.

Arts and culture
Gilbert hosts the annual Lexington County Peach Festival, held in July.

Gilbert has a public library, a branch of the Lexington County Library.

Education
Public education in Gilbert is administered by Lexington County School District One. The district operates Centerville Elementary School, Gilbert Elementary School, Gilbert Middle School, and Gilbert High School.

References

External links
 

Towns in Lexington County, South Carolina
Towns in South Carolina
Columbia metropolitan area (South Carolina)